Ali bin Abi Talib Mosque may refer to:

Ali bin Abi Talib Mosque (Irbid), Jordan
Ali bin Abi Talib Mosque (Dubai), United Arab Emirates
Ali bin Abi Talib Mosque (Sydney), Australia
Ali bin Abi Talib Mosque (Tajib), Libya
Ali bin Abi Talib Mosque (Tobruk), Libya